Lykoporia railway station is a Station in Lykoporia, a small seaside town in Corinthia, Greece. It is located just south of Lykoporia, close to the Olimpia Odos motorway. It was opened on 22 June 2020 as part of the €848-million ErgOSE project extension of the Athens Airport–Patras railway to Aigio rail line, co-financed by the European Union's Cohesion Fund 2000–2006. It should not be confused with the now-closed station on the old Piraeus–Patras railway, which is located northeast of the current station, closer to the coast of the Corinthian Gulf

History
The Station opened 22 June 2020 by Minister of Transport, Kostas Karamanlis. as part of the €848-million ErgOSE project extension of the Athens Airport–Patras railway to Aigio railline co-financed by the European Union's Cohesion Fund 2000–2006. It was one of three new stations in (Xylokastro, Akrata, and Aegio) and six holts (Diminio, Lykoporia, Lygia, Platanos Beach, Diakopto, and Eliki) to come online when the section of track opened. It should not be confused with the now-closed station on the old Piraeus–Patras railway SPAP, which is located northeast of the current station, closer to the coast of the Corinthian Gulf.

Facilities
The raised station is assessed via stairs or a ramp. It has two side platforms, with station buildings located below the platform level, with access to the platform level via stairs or lifts. The Station buildings are equipped only with a waiting area. At platform level, both platforms have sheltered seating and Dot-matrix display departure and arrival screens and timetable poster boards. There is currently no car park on-site. Currently, there is no local bus stop connecting the station.

Services

Since 15 May 2022, this station serves the following routes:

Station layout

References

See also
Hellenic Railways Organization
TrainOSE
Proastiakos
P.A.Th.E./P.

Railway stations in Corinthia
Railway stations opened in 2020